Insulator may refer to:

 Insulator (electricity), a substance that resists electricity
 Pin insulator, a device that isolates a wire from a physical support such as a pin on a utility pole
 Strain insulator, a device that is designed to work in mechanical tension to withstand the pull of a suspended electrical wire or cable
 Insulator (genetics), an element in the genetic code
 Thermal insulation, a material used to resist the flow of heat
 Building insulation, the material used in building construction to prevent heat loss
 Mott insulator, a type of electrical insulator
 Topological insulator, a material that behaves as an insulator in its interior while permitting the movement of charges on its boundary

See also 
 Insulation (disambiguation)